Central (formerly known as 4th & Cedar until November 2011) is a light rail station along the Green Line in Saint Paul, Minnesota. It is unique among Central Corridor stations in that it is not located in the middle of or directly adjacent to a road, but rather at a 45° angle to surrounding streets like the U.S. Bank Stadium station shared with the Blue Line in Minneapolis. It is located on the block bounded by 5th Street, Minnesota Street, 4th Street, and Cedar Street.

Utility relocation construction work began along 4th Street in August 2009, well before the Green Line had received final funding or approval.  Construction along Cedar Street, including demolition of the former Bremer Bank building on the block began in 2011.  A skyway through the Bremer building was closed for much of the year but reopened on November 1, 2011.  The station opened along with the rest of the line on June 14, 2014.

References

External links
Metro Transit: Central Station

Metro Green Line (Minnesota) stations in Saint Paul, Minnesota
Railway stations in the United States opened in 2014
2014 establishments in Minnesota